British Indo-Caribbean people are residents of the United Kingdom who were born in the Caribbean and whose ancestors are indigenous to India. The UK has a large population of Indo-Caribbean people.

Background
Indian people were first introduced to the Caribbean as indentured laborers by the British government beginning in the 1830s after the abolition of slavery and when cheap labour was needed. The majority settled in Trinidad and Tobago, Guyana, and Suriname. There are smaller but well established population in Jamaica and other Caribbean countries. The Indian communities in these countries have now become extremely well established and currently have a very successful diaspora. With the strong links between the Caribbean and the UK, as well as the large Indian community in the UK, it has proven a popular destination for Indo-Caribbean emigrants. In 1990, between 22,800 and 30,400 Indo-Caribbean people were estimated to be living in the UK.

Sub-groups

Indo-Guyanese

Notable Britons of Indo-Guyanese descent include Waheed Alli, Baron Alli, Shakira Caine, David Dabydeen, Gina Miller, Bishnodat Persaud, Avinash Persaud, Raj Persaud and Gordon Warnecke, and Mark Ramprakash.

Indo-Jamaicans

A notable Briton of Indo-Jamaican descent is Lee Gopthal.

Indo-Trinidadians

Indo-Trinidadian people are thought to number well over 25,000, which is even more than the number of people born in Trinidad and Tobago living in the UK according to the 2001 Census. Notable Britons of Indo-Trinidadian descent include Waheed Alli, Baron Alli, Chris Bisson, Vahni Capildeo, Krishan Kumar, Krishna Maharaj, Shiva Naipaul, V. S. Naipaul, Lakshmi Persaud, Avinash Persaud and Raj Persaud.

Indo-Surinamese

See also
 Indo-Caribbeans
 British Indians
 Indian Canadians
 British African-Caribbean people
 British Asian
 Indo-Caribbean Americans

References

 

 Indo-Caribbean
Indo-Caribbean
 Indo-Caribbean
 Indo-Caribbean